Kurunegalage Ramani Perera (born 29 August 1976) is a Sri Lankan former cricketer who played as a right-arm leg break bowler and right-handed batter. She appeared in one Test match and 19 Women's One Day Internationals for Sri Lanka between 1997 and 2002, including appearing at the 1997 and 2000 World Cups. She played domestic cricket for Slimline Sports Club and Colts Cricket Club.

References

External links
 
 

1976 births
Living people
Cricketers from Colombo
Sri Lankan women cricketers
Sri Lanka women Test cricketers
Sri Lanka women One Day International cricketers
Slimline Sport Club women cricketers
Colts Cricket Club women cricketers